The Petah Tikva Museum of Art is an art museum in Arlozorov Street, Petah Tikva, Israel.

History
The museum is part of Petah Tikva's Museum Complex. Most of the art at the museum (roughly 3188 items) is art in memory and perpetuation of others, and were collected by Yad Labanim. The building originally opened in 1952, and was the first of its kind in Israel, and the museum itself opened in 1964. Between 1987 and 1993, the museum's director was Dalia Levin. In 2004, the building was reopened after renovation of the building and cataloging the collection of artwork. At the time, Drorit Gur Arye had become the director of the museum. The museum is divided into a changing exhibition hall, and a smaller gallery, which presents an exhibition of the museum's collections.

See also
Israeli art
List of museums in Israel

References

External links
Petah Tikva Museum of Art Official Website

1964 establishments in Israel
Museums in Israel
Art museums and galleries in Israel